Ketodarolutamide (developmental code names ORM-15341, BAY-1896953) is a nonsteroidal antiandrogen (NSAA) and the major active metabolite of darolutamide (ODM-201, BAY-1841788), an NSAA which is used in the treatment of prostate cancer in men. Similarly to its parent compound, darolutamide acts as a highly selective, high-affinity, competitive silent antagonist of the androgen receptor (AR). Both agents show much higher affinity and more potent inhibition of the AR relative to the other NSAAs enzalutamide and apalutamide, although they also possess much shorter and comparatively less favorable elimination half-lives. They have also been found not to activate certain mutant AR variants that enzalutamide and apalutamide do activate. Both darolutamide and ketodarolutamide show limited central nervous system distribution, indicating peripheral selectivity, and little or no inhibition or induction of cytochrome P450 enzymes such as CYP3A4, unlike enzalutamide and apalutamide.

References

External links
 ODM-201 – New generation androgen receptor inhibitor targeting resistance mechanisms to androgen signalling-directed prostate cancer therapies - Orion Pharma Poster Presentation

Carboxamides
Chlorobenzenes
Hormonal antineoplastic drugs
Human drug metabolites
Nitriles
Nonsteroidal antiandrogens
Peripherally selective drugs
Pyrazoles